Kitsonville is an unincorporated community in Lewis County, West Virginia, United States.

The community most likely was named after the local Kitson family.

References 

Unincorporated communities in West Virginia
Unincorporated communities in Lewis County, West Virginia